Frederick Thomson may refer to:
 Sir Frederick Thomson, 1st Baronet (1875–1935), Scottish jurist & politician 
 Fred Thomson (1890–1928), American actor (also given-named Frederick Clifton) 
 Frederick Whitley-Thomson (1851–1925), British politician for Skipton
 Frederick A. Thomson (1869–1925), director of silent films

See also
Frederick Thompson (disambiguation)